Calvin Wilson Mateer (sometimes misspelt "Matteer") (9 January 1836 – 28 September 1908) was a missionary to China with the American Presbyterian Mission. He was of Scottish-Irish descent and a native of Cumberland County, Pennsylvania. He graduated from Western Theological Seminary, Pittsburgh. After serving with the Presbyterian church of Delaware, Ohio, for two years, he arrived in Dengzhou (today part of  Penglai City, Shandong) with his wife Julia Brown Mateer in early January 1864 and continued to work as a missionary in China for 45 years.

He was the chairman of the committee for Bible translation and presided over the translation of the widely circulated Chinese translation of the Holy Bible, The Chinese Union Version.

In 1882, Mateer founded Tengchow College as the first modern institution of higher education in China. Tengchow College became a predecessor of Cheeloo University, and finally of Shandong University.

His Course of Mandarin Lessons, based on idiom, first published in 1892, was a popular text for learners, garnering four further editions by 1922.

He died in 1908 in Qingdao, China.

References

Presbyterian missionaries in China
Translators of the Bible into Chinese
American Presbyterian missionaries
1836 births
1908 deaths
People from Cumberland County, Pennsylvania
American expatriates in China
Pittsburgh Theological Seminary alumni
Missionary educators
Missionary linguists